Robert Wright (born January 15, 1957) is an American journalist and author who writes about science, history, politics, and religion. He has written five books: Three Scientists and Their Gods: Looking for Meaning in an Age of Information (1988), The Moral Animal (1994), Nonzero: The Logic of Human Destiny (1999), The Evolution of God (2009), and Why Buddhism is True (2017). As of 2019, Wright is a Visiting Professor of Science and Religion at Union Theological Seminary, New York. He is the co-founder and editor-in-chief of Bloggingheads.tv and the founder and editor-in-chief of Meaningoflife.tv.

Early life and education
Wright was born in Lawton, Oklahoma to a Southern Baptist  family and raised in (among other places) San Francisco. A self-described "Army brat", Wright attended Texas Christian University for a year in the late 1970s, before transferring to Princeton University to study sociobiology, which was a precursor to evolutionary psychology. His professors at college included author John McPhee, whose style influenced Wright's first book, Three Scientists and Their Gods: Looking for Meaning in an Age of Information.

Career

Journalism
Wright served as a Senior Editor at The Sciences and The New Republic,  and as an editor at The Wilson Quarterly.  He has been a contributing editor at The New Republic (where he also co-authored the "TRB" column), Time, and Slate, and has written for The Atlantic Monthly, The New Yorker,  and The New York Times Magazine. He contributes frequently to The New York Times, including a stint as guest columnist for the month of April, 2007 and as a contributor to The Opinionator, a web-only opinion page in 2010. Wright became a senior editor of The Atlantic on January 1, 2012. As of February, 2015, the magazine's author page describes him as "a former senior editor at The Atlantic."

University teaching and research
In early 2000, Wright began teaching at Princeton University and the University of Pennsylvania, teaching a graduate seminar called "Religion and Human Nature" and an undergraduate course called "The Evolution of Religion." At Princeton, Wright was a Laurence S. Rockefeller Visiting Fellow and began co-teaching a graduate seminar with Peter Singer on the biological basis of moral intuition. In 2014, Wright taught a six-week Coursera MOOC on "Buddhism and Modern Psychology". As of 2019, Wright is a Visiting Professor of Science and Religion at Union Theological Seminary, New York. Also as of 2019, Wright is a Senior Fellow at the think tank New America.

Meaningoflife.tv
In 2002, Wright ventured into video-on-Internet with his MeaningofLife.tv website, developed by Greg Dingle, in which he interviews a range of thinkers on their ideas about science, philosophy, meditation, spirituality, and other topics. Meaningoflife.tv is sponsored by Slate magazine, and made possible through funding by the Templeton Foundation. Other hosts include John Horgan, Daniel Kaufman, Nikita Petrov, and Aryeh Cohen-Wade.

Bloggingheads.tv

On November 1, 2005, Wright, blogger Mickey Kaus, and Greg Dingle launched Bloggingheads.tv,  a current-events diavlog. Bloggingheads diavlogs are conducted via webcam, and can be viewed online or downloaded either as WMV or MP4 video files or as MP3 sound files. New diavlogs are posted approximately 5-10 times a week and are archived. While many diavlogs feature Wright, other hosts at Bloggingheads.tv include Glenn Loury, John McWhorter, Bill Scher, Matt Lewis, Kat Rosenfield, Phoebe Maltz-Bovy, and Aryeh Cohen-Wade.

Views on religion
Wright has written extensively on the topic of religion, particularly in The Evolution of God. In 2009, When asked by Bill Moyers if God is a figment of the human imagination, Wright responded:

On The Colbert Report, Wright said he was "not an atheist" but did not believe in any of the three Abrahamic religions. He opposes creationism, including intelligent design. Wright has a strictly materialist conception of natural selection; however, he does not deny the possibility of some larger purpose unfolding, that natural selection could itself be the product of design, in the context of teleology. Wright describes what he calls the "changing moods of God", arguing that religion is adaptable and based on the political, economic and social circumstances of the culture, rather than strictly scriptural interpretation.

Wright has also been critical of organized atheism and describes himself more specifically as a secular humanist. Wright makes a distinction between religion being wrong and bad and is hesitant to agree that its bad effects greatly outweigh its good effects. He sees organized atheism as attempting to actively convert people in the same way as many religions do. Wright views it as being counterproductive to think of religion as being the root cause of today's problems.

In Why Buddhism is True, Wright advocates a secular, Westernized form of Buddhism focusing on the practice of mindfulness meditation and stripped of the element of rebirth (Buddhism). He believes Buddhism's diagnosis of the causes of human suffering is vindicated by evolutionary biology and evolutionary psychology. He further argues that the modern psychological idea of the modularity of mind resonates with the Buddhist teaching of no-self (anatman).

Personal life
Wright lives in Princeton, New Jersey, with his wife Lisa and their two daughters. They have two dogs named Frazier and Milo, who are featured in a few Bloggingheads.tv episodes.

Books

 1989 Three Scientists and Their Gods: Looking for Meaning in an Age of Information. 
 1994 The Moral Animal: Why We Are the Way We Are: The New Science of Evolutionary Psychology. 
 1999 Nonzero: The Logic of Human Destiny. 
 2009 The Evolution of God. Little, Brown and Company. 
 2017 Why Buddhism is True: The Science and Philosophy of Meditation and Enlightenment.

Awards and recognition
The Evolution of God was one of three finalists for the 2010 Pulitzer Prize for General Non-Fiction. 
 The New York Times Book Review chose Wright's The Moral Animal as one of the 10 best books of 1994;  it was a national bestseller and has been published in 12 languages.
 Nonzero: The Logic of Human Destiny was a The New York Times Book Review Notable Book in the year 2000 and has been published in nine languages. Fortune magazine included Nonzero on a list of "the 75 smartest [business-related] books of all time." 
 Wright's first book, Three Scientists and Their Gods: Looking for Meaning in an Age of Information, was published in 1988 and was nominated for a National Book Critics Circle Award.
 Wright's column "The Information Age," written for The Sciences magazine, won the National Magazine Award for Essay and Criticism.

References

External links
 
 
 
 EvolutionofGod.net - A website for Wright's book The Evolution of God
 Nonzero.org - A website for Wright's book Nonzero: The Logic of Human Destiny
 Bloggingheads.tv
 MeaningofLife.tv 
 Wright's Mindful Resistance newsletter
 Contributions to Slate magazine
 Literary Nonfiction Piece on Wright

1957 births
Living people
American male journalists
American religious writers
American science writers
Critics of atheism
Critics of creationism
Douglas MacArthur High School (San Antonio) alumni
Materialists
Consequentialists
Utilitarians
People from Lawton, Oklahoma
People from Princeton, New Jersey
Princeton University alumni
Radical centrist writers
Secular humanists
Science journalists
Texas Christian University alumni
Video bloggers
Writers from Oklahoma
New America (organization)
American male bloggers
American bloggers